Orndoff may refer to:

Places
Orndoff, West Virginia, an unincorporated community in Webster County
Orndoff-Cross House, a historic home in West Virginia

People with the surname
Harry Westley Orndoff
Scott Orndoff, American football player

See also
Orndorff (disambiguation)